Mohammad Nasim Baras (also Nasim Khan; born 30 March 1993) is an Afghan cricketer.  Baras is a left-handed batsman who bowls slow left-arm orthodox.

Baras made his Twenty20 debut for the Afghan Cheetahs in the Faysal Bank Twenty-20 Cup against Faisalabad Wolves.  He made a further appearance in that competition against Multan Tigers. He scored 17 runs in this two appearances, as well as taking two wickets at an average of 17.50.

He made his Twenty20 International debut on 28 November 2015 against Hong Kong.

References

External links

Afghanistan ACC T20 Squad at Asian Cricket Council

1993 births
Living people
Afghan cricketers
Afghanistan Twenty20 International cricketers
Afghan Cheetahs cricketers
Asian Games medalists in cricket
Cricketers at the 2014 Asian Games
Asian Games silver medalists for Afghanistan
Medalists at the 2014 Asian Games